Flotsam is a survival simulation video game developed and published by Pajama Llama Games, which released in early access on Steam, Kartridge, GoG, Itch.io and Humble Store on September 26, 2019. It was previously published by Kongregate, until the developers self-published it in 2020.

Gameplay 
Flotsam is a townbuilding survival game. In the game you start with a group of stranded survivors in a flooded world. The gameplay revolves around you as a player guiding these survivors through the world while recycling all the garbage that is found in the ocean.

Development
Flotsam is developed by Ghent-based indie studio Pajama Llama Games. The game released in early access on Steam, Kartridge, GoG and Humble Bundle September 26, 2019.

Reception 
During development Flotsam has already won several prizes.

References 

Video games developed in Belgium
City-building games
Early access video games
MacOS games
Windows games
2019 video games